Pagan Love Song is a 1950 American romantic musical film released by MGM and starring Esther Williams and Howard Keel. Set in Tahiti, it was based on the novel Tahiti Landfall by William S. Stone.

Plot 
Mimi Bennett lives with her wealthy aunt Kate on the Polynesian isle of Tahiti. A half-indigenous, half-White girl, Mimi's dream is to someday leave the South Pacific to live in America.

Hazard Endicott's arrival changes her plans. He is a schoolteacher from Ohio who has inherited a Tahiti estate. His first task is to hire a servant and, mistaking Mimi for a native girl, offers her the job. She amuses herself by feigning a bare grasp of English.

The estate turns out to be little more than a shack. Endicott also miscalculates an invitation to a party at Kate's, coming in casual island attire to an event with elegantly dressed guests. Mimi takes pity on him, and a romance blooms.

Cast 
 Esther Williams as Mimi Bennett (singing voice was dubbed by Betty Wand)
 Howard Keel as Hazard Endicott
 Minna Gombell as Kate
 Charles Mauu as Tavee
 Rita Moreno as Teuru

Production 
The film was originally announced as Tahiti and was to star Ann Miller, Howard Keel and Ricardo Montalbán. Eventually Miller was replaced by Esther Williams and Montalbán by Charles Mauu. The title was then changed to Hawaii.

The film was to have been directed by Stanley Donen, but Williams refused to work with him after her experience filming the previous year's Take Me Out to the Ball Game. Location shooting took place on the Hawaiian island of Kauai.

Williams realized that she was pregnant while making the film. She claimed that she nearly drowned during filming.

The film exceeded its budget by $400,000.

Reception
In a contemporary review, Thomas M. Pryor of The New York Times praised the scenery and Williams' "aquatic exercises" but panned the film overall: "Presumably there is a story somewhere in the picture, but all we can recollect is a series of incidents, some eye-filling and some amusing, others rather pointless and tedious. Perhaps life on the island is just too idyllic."

According to MGM records, the film earned $2,157,000 in the U.S. and Canada and $1,203,000 elsewhere, resulting in a profit of $108,000. This was considered a relative disappointment for an Esther Williams film.

References

External links
 
 
 
 
 

1950 films
1950 musical comedy films
American musical comedy films
American romantic comedy films
Metro-Goldwyn-Mayer films
Swimming films
Films set in French Polynesia
Films shot in Hawaii
Films based on American novels
Films produced by Arthur Freed
American romantic musical films
1950 romantic comedy films
1950s English-language films
1950s American films